Mayantha Yaswanth Dissanayake (born 11 January 1974) is a Member of Parliament from Kandy District.  He was a Provincial Councillor of the Central Provincial Council. He was SLFP organizer to Ampara District under former president Mahinda Rajapaksa. 2010 he supported General Sarath Fonseka in 2010 presidential election and crossover from SLFP to UNP. He appointed as chief organizer to Ududumbara electorate, Nawalapitiya electorate and at last Yatinuwara electorate. A few years later he polled  the second highest number of preferential votes in the Kandy district to be elected as a Councillor of the Central Provincial Council. He is a son of Gamini Dissanayake, a Presidential candidate and a powerful minister of the United National Party from 1977 to 1994. A  grandson of Andrew Dissanayake who served as an MP for the Nuwara Eliya electorate and a deputy minister in the S. W. R. D. Bandaranaike's government. His brother, Navin Dissanayake is an MP for UNP from Nuwara Eliya District. He was educated at the  Royal College Colombo.

Dissanayake is currently serving as the chief organizer for the Yatinuwara electorate for the United National Party.

See also
 List of political families in Sri Lanka

References

External links
Members of 6th Council 2013-2018 - Central Provincial Council, Sri Lanka
Mayantha Dissanayake - The Emerging Leader
A‘giant’ in the making!

1974 births
Living people
Sri Lankan Buddhists
Alumni of Royal College, Colombo
Samagi Jana Balawegaya politicians
United National Party politicians
Provincial councillors of Sri Lanka 
Members of the 15th Parliament of Sri Lanka
Members of the 16th Parliament of Sri Lanka
Sinhalese politicians